Marine Ghazaryan (born November 28, 1985 in Armenian SSR) is an Armenian sprinter. She competed at the 2004 Summer Olympics in the women's 100 metres. Ghazaryan's best 100 meter timing is 11.8, achieved in 2003.

References

External links
 Sports-Reference.com

1985 births
Living people
Armenian female sprinters
Olympic athletes of Armenia
Athletes (track and field) at the 2004 Summer Olympics
Olympic female sprinters